Juan Manuel Hernández Sánchez (born 22 July 1986 in Jaén, Andalusia), known as Juanma, is a Spanish professional footballer who plays for UE Sant Julià as a midfielder.

External links

1986 births
Living people
Footballers from Jaén, Spain
Spanish footballers
Association football midfielders
Segunda División players
Segunda División B players
Tercera División players
CE Mataró players
RCD Espanyol B footballers
Cádiz CF players
Girona FC players
UD Almería B players
CD Leganés players
Lleida Esportiu footballers
CF Badalona players
FC Jūrmala players
Spanish expatriate footballers
Expatriate footballers in Latvia